Fernando Hernández Casado (born 24 February 1973) is a Spanish handball player who competed in the 1996 Summer Olympics and in the 2004 Summer Olympics.

He was born in Valladolid.

In 1996 he won the bronze medal with the Spanish team. He played one match and scored three goals.

Eight years later he was a member of the Spanish handball team which finished seventh in the 2004 Olympic tournament. He played all eight matches and scored 15 goals.

External links
profile

1973 births
Living people
Spanish male handball players
Olympic handball players of Spain
Handball players at the 1996 Summer Olympics
Handball players at the 2004 Summer Olympics
Olympic bronze medalists for Spain
Liga ASOBAL players
CB Ademar León players
BM Valladolid players
SDC San Antonio players
Olympic medalists in handball
Medalists at the 1996 Summer Olympics